Peter Fryer (18 February 1927 – 31 October 2006) was an English Marxist writer and journalist. Among his most influential works is the 1984 book Staying Power: The History of Black People in Britain.

Early life
Born in Hull in 1927, Peter Fryer was awarded a scholarship to attend Hymers College in 1938. After joining the Young Communist League in 1942, he left school in 1943 to become a reporter on the Yorkshire Post. In 1945 he became a member of the Communist Party. In 1947 he was dismissed from his job after refusing to leave the party.

In 1948 Fryer joined the staff of the Daily Worker, becoming its parliamentary correspondent but also covering foreign affairs. In 1949 he reported on the show trial of the Hungarian communist László Rajk, who had falsely confessed to being an agent of Tito and others. After Rajk's execution and eventual "rehabilitation" early in 1956 Fryer felt guilty about his acquiescence in the trial.

Hungarian uprising

In October 1956 Fryer was sent to Hungary to cover the uprising. His dispatches, including a description of the suppression of the uprising by Soviet troops, were either heavily censored or suppressed, and he left the paper. His resignation had in fact taken place several months earlier, but he had been persuaded to serve a year's notice. He wrote a book about the uprising (Hungarian Tragedy, 1956) and was expelled from the Communist Party for criticising its suppression in the "capitalist" press. Hungarian Tragedy is still in print. The most recent edition also contains some articles he completed after the book, which were published very quickly after the events he witnessed.

Fryer then became the editor of The Newsletter, the journal of The Club, a Trotskyist organisation led by Gerry Healy, and with Healy was a founder member of the Socialist Labour League. He parted company with Healy, however, and was delighted when Healy's organisation expelled him in 1985. Fryer wrote a weekly column for the Workers Press, the paper of the organisation that had expelled Healy, for several years after 1985. As a socialist journalist he was inspiring and painstaking, and wrote articles about how to write for the widest political audience, later collected in his book Lucid, Vigorous and Brief (1993).

Empire Windrush
In 1948 Fryer had covered the arrival at Tilbury Docks in Britain of  bringing settlers from the Caribbean. His interest in their experiences ultimately resulted in the writing of Staying Power: The History of Black People in Britain (1984). Two short related books by Fryer, originally given as lectures, are also in print: Aspects of British Black History and The Politics of Windrush.

Later life
At the time of his death Fryer was working on a study of life in Mississippi in the 19th and 20th centuries, under the working title Behind the Blues. He intended this book to rework black American history and hoped that it would be as influential as Staying Power had been. He had also just found out that he was to be honoured by the Hungarian government, in recognition of his "continuous support of the Hungarian revolution and freedom fight". Fryer was posthumously awarded the Knight's Cross of the Order of Merit of the Republic of Hungary at a reception at the Hungarian Embassy in London.

References

External links
Peter Fryer and Hungarian Tragedy and other writings on the Hungarian revolution 1956 at Index Books.
"A Bibliography of the Books and Journalism of Peter Fryer (1927–2006)". Scissors & Paste Bibliographies.
"Hungarian Tragedy – Peter Fryer"
Peter Fryer and the Politics of Black British History by Christian Hogsbjerg, International Socialism, 172 (2021)

1927 births
2006 deaths
People from Kingston upon Hull
Communist Party of Great Britain members
Workers Revolutionary Party (UK) members
English Trotskyists
British Marxists
English male journalists
British Marxist journalists
People educated at Hymers College